Lagunas (Spanish: lagoons) may refer to:

Lagunas de Ruidera, park
Lagunas de Nisibón, city in the Dominican Republic
Lagunas District, Alto Amazonas, Peru
Lagunas District, Chiclayo, Peru
Lagunas de Mejia National Sanctuary, Peru
Lagunas de Chacahua National Park, Oaxaca, Mexico
San Bernardino Lagunas, Puebla, Mexico

See also
Las Lagunas (disambiguation)
Laguna (disambiguation)
Lagunitas (disambiguation)